From the Edge of the Deep Green Sea may refer to:

"From the Edge of the Deep Green Sea", a song by The Cure from Wish
"From the Edge of the Deep Green Sea", an episode of the TV series One Tree Hill